Jimmy Insolo (born February 4, 1943) is a NASCAR Winston Cup Series race driver whose career spanned from 1970 to 1983.

Career
Insolo began his career at Saugus Speedway, where he became one of the top drivers at the track. In addition to his Winston Cup Series starts, Insolo would make 129 appearances in a Chevrolet vehicle in the Winston West division of NASCAR. Insolo finished an average of 21st place after starting an average of 13th. His only DNQ came at the 1972 Miller High Life 500. Jimmy's total earnings as a driver were $59,785 ($ when adjusted for inflation). One of his famous races involved Insolo racing at the Westwood Motorsport Park (now developed into the Westwood Plateau neighborhood along with the Westwood Plateau Golf & Country Club).

Before Insolo stepped onto the NASCAR scene, very few West Coast drivers had any level of success in NASCAR. Drivers from that part of the United States were forced by necessity to race in the specially-designated Winston West Series. Racing in the Southeastern United States back in the early days of NASCAR was a financially unsustainable activity that brought about meager amounts of money that probably couldn't feed the family or pay the bills back then. The multimillion-dollar purses that make up the basis for today's NASCAR Cup Series races didn't appear until at least the 1980s. For example, the 1955 Southern 500, one of the highest paying events prior to the inaugural running of the Daytona 500 paid only $50 as its lowest prize ($ when adjusted for inflation).

Insolo would race in the days before Kevin Harvick, Ron Hornaday, and Kurt Busch made NASCAR into a household name west of the Mississippi River. Derrike Cope, Ernie Irvan, and Chad Little would become a few of his "West Coast" contemporaries. He was the 1978 NASCAR Winston West Series champion.

Awards
Insolo was inducted in the West Coast Stock Car Hall of Fame in its first class (2002).

References

External links
 

1943 births
Living people
NASCAR drivers
People from Mission Hills, Santa Barbara County, California
Racing drivers from California
USAC Stock Car drivers